Frederick P. Kessler (born January 11, 1940) is a retired American lawyer, arbitrator, judge, and Democratic Party politician.  He served as a member of the Wisconsin State Assembly for 24 years between 1961 and 2019, and served 11 years as a state judge in the 1970s and 1980s.

He is married to retired Wisconsin Court of Appeals Judge Joan F. Kessler.

Early life
Kessler was born January 11, 1940, in Milwaukee, and attended Our Redeemer Lutheran School in Madison until he became a Page of the United States House of Representatives, serving from 1955 and attending the House Page School. He ultimately graduated from Milwaukee Lutheran High School and worked briefly as a machine operator (becoming a member of the United Steel Workers) and salesman, before his 1960 election to the Assembly. He was involved in the movement to draft John F. Kennedy to run for President in 1960, serving as Chairman of the Wisconsin Youth for Kennedy Club in 1959. He was the youngest Chairman of the Wauwatosa City Democratic Committee at age 19.

First terms in the Assembly
In 1960, Kessler ran for Wisconsin State Assembly in Milwaukee County's 10th Assembly district (at the time the district comprised just the 10th ward of the city of Milwaukee).  Kessler was one of five Democrats challenging incumbent Patrick H. Kelly in the Democratic primary.  Kessler ultimately prevailed with 38% of the vote and went on to defeat Republican Herbert W. Smith in the general election. On the opening day of the 1961 legislative session, January 11, 1961, Kessler's 21st birthday, he became the youngest person, up to that time, ever to serve in the Wisconsin Legislature. He was assigned to the standing committee on education. In 1962, rather than running for re-election, he sought the Democratic nomination for the Wisconsin's 6th State Senate district, but came in 2nd to Martin J. Schreiber in a four-way primary. Patrick Kelly reclaimed his old Assembly seat.

While serving in the Assembly, Kessler earned his bachelor's degree from the University of Wisconsin-Madison in 1962, and after his term expired, he worked with Governor John Reynolds' staff on reapportionment litigation in 1964.

In 1964, he again unseated Patrick Kelly, taking an absolute majority in a five-way Democratic primary (Kelly himself came in third), and won the general election 7,004 to 2,525. He was assigned to the Assembly committees on elections and the judiciary, and a joint committee on revisions, repeals and uniform laws.  Kessler received a law degree from the University of Wisconsin Law School in 1966, and was re-elected easily in 1966, 1968 and 1970.

Redistricting

Kessler played a significant role in Wisconsin's redistricting fights of the 1960s and 1970s.  In the 1960s, he was part of Governor Reynolds' team arguing before the Wisconsin Supreme Court over the failure of the state Legislature to pass a new redistricting plan after the 1960 census.  After the Legislature failed to meet several deadlines, the Court ultimately drew its own map.  Governor Reynolds embraced the court-ordered map and called it, "the culmination of my four-year fight for equal voting rights for the people of the state of Wisconsin."

In 1971, Kessler was chairman of the Assembly elections committee and the principal negotiator for Democrats crafting a new reapportionment bill.  The 1970s redistricting was further complicated by the new federal Voting Rights Act of 1965 and accompanying U.S. Supreme Court opinions which set a legal mandate for states to seek equal representation in legislative districts.  Requirements in the Wisconsin Constitution created unique technical challenges to achieving equal representation, and the state government was under divided partisan control.  Kessler set out a plan to achieve the various goals by disregarding strict adherence to county boundaries, eliminating 1 Assembly seat, and establishing a uniform 3-to-1 ratio of Assembly to Senate seats.  Republicans and Democrats soon agreed with his recommendations, but disagreed over the final map.  Finally, in an April 1972 special session of the Legislature, a compromise was reached.

Judiciary
After the end of the Legislative session in 1972, Lucey appointed Kessler to a vacant county judgeship.  He was subsequently elected to a full term in April 1973.

Kessler was appointed to the Wisconsin Legislative Council Committee on Court Reorganization in 1978. He was a leader in the fight for a single level trial court and the appointment by the Supreme Court of the district chief judges (both which were approved by an 8 to 7 vote on the committee, and ultimately signed into law). He also initiated a successful effort in 1979, to outlaw commercial surety bail bonding, resulting in Wisconsin becoming the fourth state to prohibit the practice.  Due to the judicial reform law, his position of county judge was abolished and he was transitioned into a circuit judge for Milwaukee County, effective August 1, 1978.  He was elected to another term April 3, 1979.

Kessler resigned his judgeship on June 2, 1981, to attempt a run for the vacant seat in Wisconsin's 5th congressional district in 1982.  Kessler came in 2nd in the crowded ten-person Democratic primary, which included several past and current legislators, county supervisors, and the wife of Milwaukee mayor Henry Maier.

In April 1986, Kessler ran for and defeated controversial Wisconsin circuit judge Christ T. Seraphim by a final margin (after recounts) of 485 votes (55,690 to Seraphim's 55,205). He resigned the judgeship in early 1988 when he planned to make another run for United States House of Representatives, but ultimately dropped out before the primary.

After the judiciary
After leaving the court, Kessler worked as an attorney, labor arbitrator, and redistricting consultant.

As a civic leader, Kessler, in 1979, along with Milwaukee School Board member Leon Todd successfully led an effort to create three language immersion elementary schools in Milwaukee, one each in German, French and Spanish, see Milwaukee German Immersion School, Milwaukee French Immersion School. On May 15, 2014, Kessler and Todd receive a lifetime achievement award from the German Immersion Foundation for their effort in 1979.

He made another run for Congress in 1992 when the 5th congressional district seat became vacant again, but came in 3rd in a six-person Democratic primary.

Return to the Assembly
On April 6, 2004, his wife Joan F. Kessler, a long-time member of the board of governors of the State Bar of Wisconsin, unseated incumbent Court of Appeals Judge Charles B. Schudson. In November 2004, Fred Kessler returned to the Assembly, from the 12th District (northwestern Milwaukee, a part of Wauwatosa and one precinct in Waukesha County). He was assigned to the committees on campaigns and elections; criminal justice and homeland security; the judiciary; and state-federal relations. He was re-elected without opposition in 2006 and 2008; and in 2010 won re-election over Republican Sam Hagedorn.

In 2012, after a drastic redistricting by the Republican-controlled legislature removed his home from the 12th and changed the racial complexion completely, Kessler faced a challenge in the Democratic primary from African-American newcomer Mario Hall, who was reported to be a school choice supporter with backing from the pro-voucher American Federation for Children and allied organizations. Kessler (who had to move into the redrawn district) won with 71% of the vote, and faced no challenger in the November general election. Kessler was re-elected without significant opposition in 2014 (one Democratic and one Republican challenger failed to make the ballot; the Republican received .3% of the vote in the general election as a write-in candidate). In 2016, he had no challengers in the primary or general election.

Kessler ran for re-election in 2018 but was defeated in the Democratic primary by schoolteacher LaKeshia Myers.

Personal life
Kessler is a member of Goethe House (vice president, former president); the Milwaukee Chapter of the ACLU (board member, former president); World Affairs Council of Milwaukee (board member); Wisconsin Bar Association; Wisconsin State Historical Society (board member); Industrial Relations Research Association, DANK (German-American National Congress) - Milwaukee chapter (former vice president); Milwaukee Donauschwaben; Amnesty International Group 107 (former chairman); Milwaukee Turners; N.A.A.C.P.; and a former member of the City of Milwaukee Harbor Commission.

He and Joan have two children.

Electoral history

Wisconsin Assembly (1960)

| colspan="6" style="text-align:center;background-color: #e9e9e9;"| Democratic Primary, September 13, 1960

| colspan="6" style="text-align:center;background-color: #e9e9e9;"| General Election, November 3, 1960

Wisconsin Senate (1962)

| colspan="6" style="text-align:center;background-color: #e9e9e9;"| Democratic Primary, September 11, 1962

Wisconsin Assembly (1964–1970)

U.S. House of Representatives (1982)

| colspan="6" style="text-align:center;background-color: #e9e9e9;"| Democratic Primary, September 14, 1982

Wisconsin Circuit Court (1986)

| colspan="6" style="text-align:center;background-color: #e9e9e9;"| General Election, April 1, 1986

U.S. House of Representatives (1988, 1992)

| colspan="6" style="text-align:center;background-color: #e9e9e9;"| Democratic Primary, September 13, 1988

| colspan="6" style="text-align:center;background-color: #e9e9e9;"| Democratic Primary, September 13, 1988

Wisconsin Assembly (2004–2018)

References

External links
Official government website

Follow the Money - Fred Kessler
2008 2006 2004 campaign contributions
Campaign 2008 campaign contributions at Wisconsin Democracy Campaign

|-

|-

1940 births
Living people
Politicians from Milwaukee
University of Wisconsin–Madison alumni
Democratic Party members of the Wisconsin State Assembly
Wisconsin state court judges
2012 United States presidential electors
21st-century American politicians
Lawyers from Milwaukee